"First Class" is a song by American rapper Jack Harlow, released through Atlantic Records and Generation Now as the second single from Harlow's second album Come Home the Kids Miss You on April 8, 2022. The song was produced by Rogét Chahayed, BabeTruth, Charlie Handsome, Jasper Harris and Nickie Jon Pabón, and heavily samples the 2006 Fergie song "Glamorous", which features Ludacris and was produced by Polow da Don. The song went viral on TikTok before its release.

"First Class" debuted at number one on the US Billboard Hot 100, becoming Harlow's second song (and first solo song) to top the chart, after his collaboration with Lil Nas X on "Industry Baby" in 2021. It was also his first to debut atop the chart. The song also entered atop the charts in Australia, Canada and New Zealand, peaked at number two in Austria, Germany, Ireland, Lithuania, South Africa, Switzerland and the UK, and within the top ten in Denmark, Finland, the Netherlands, Norway and Sweden.

Background
Harlow posted a snippet of the track on social media on April 1, 2022, captioning it in part "How 'bout this one next?" The snippet went viral on TikTok, with users responding to the song's "summery vibes", with the clips featuring the song gaining a total of 28.8 million views before its official release.

Composition
The song sees Harlow rapping about his "journey to success" and also "spelling out what's in store for his traveling companion" over a soft piano melody, which leads into Harlow interpolating the chorus of Fergie's 2006 song "Glamorous". The track also contains a reference to Euphoria actor Angus Cloud.

Music video
The video clip was made available along with the release of Come Home the Kids Miss You, at midnight on May 6, 2022. Parts of the video are in black and white and it features a cameo appearance from Brazilian singer Anitta.

Live performances
On May 15, Harlow performed "First Class" at the 2022 Billboard Music Awards. On June 26, Harlow performed "First Class" at the 2022 BET Awards alongside Brandy, who released a freestyle to the song's instrumental a month earlier. On August 28, Harlow performed "First Class" at the 2022 MTV Video Music Awards, with Fergie joining him to perform "Glamorous", which Harlow sampled for "First Class".

Commercial performance
"First Class" debuted at number one on the US Billboard Hot 100, becoming the year's first hip hop song to reach the top. It earned the biggest streaming week of 2022 at the time, and the biggest opening week since Drake's "Way 2 Sexy" featuring Future and Young Thug in September 2021. The song spent three non-consecutive weeks at number one and also reached number one on the Radio Songs chart where it led for 4 consecutive weeks, becoming his first leader there. With three weeks atop the Hot 100, it is the longest running number one rap song in 2022. The song also peaked at number one on the Hot Rap Songs chart, as his second leader. The song ultimately peaked at number 6 on the Billboard Hot 100 year-end chart, making it the highest charting rap song of 2022 and at number 1 on the Hot R&B/Hip-Hop Songs year-end chart.

"First Class" debuted atop the Australian ARIA Singles Chart, becoming Harlow's first number one in the country. It also debuted at number one in New Zealand, making it Harlow's first solo number one and second overall chart-topping song after the Lil Nas X collaboration "Industry Baby". "First Class" also debuted at number one on the Canadian Hot 100, making it Harlow's first number-one song on the chart. The song debuted and peaked at number two in Austria, Germany, Ireland, Lithuania, South Africa , and also debuted within the top ten in Denmark, Finland, the Netherlands, Norway, Sweden and Switzerland. "First Class" debuted at number two on the UK Singles chart and spent 5 consecutive weeks there, blocked from the top by Harry Styles "As It Was". It spent 9 weeks in the top ten.

Charts

Weekly charts

Year-end charts

Certifications

Release history

References

2022 singles
2022 songs
Atlantic Records singles
Billboard Hot 100 number-one singles
Canadian Hot 100 number-one singles
Jack Harlow songs
Number-one singles in Australia
Number-one singles in New Zealand
Songs written by Fergie (singer)
Songs written by Jack Harlow
Songs written by Rogét Chahayed